Kyzyl-Chishma (Qıźıl Şişmä) is a rural locality (a village) in Miyakinsky Selsoviet, Miyakinsky District, Bashkortostan, Russia. The population was 178 as of 2010. There are 2 streets.

Geography 
Kyzyl-Chishma is located 5 km northwest of Kirgiz-Miyaki (the district's administrative centre) by road. Kirgiz-Miyaki is the nearest rural locality.

References 

Rural localities in Miyakinsky District